Krasny Pakhar is a rural locality (a settlement) in Volokonovsky District, Belgorod Oblast, Russia. The population was 62 as of 2010. There is 1 street.

Geography 
Krasny Pakhar is located 17 km southwest of Volokonovka (the district's administrative centre) by road. Verkhniye Lubyanki is the nearest rural locality.

References 

Rural localities in Volokonovsky District